The Singapore national youth football team, nicknamed the Cubs, can refer to either of the following teams: the Under-16 team that represented the nation in the inaugural Youth Olympic Games and the Lion City Cup, and the Under-15s, which also took part in the Lion City Cup, and also the AFF U16 Championship. The youth team's honours include bronze for the Youth Olympic Games in 2010 on home soil, as well as second and third places for the Lion City Cup (the former being the U16s and the latter being the U15s).

History

Youth Olympics – The road to bronze (2010)
2010 marked the breakthrough for the Under-15 team as they went through the Youth Olympic Games, held on home soil, comfortably. They got through the semi-finals before losing to eventual silver medalists Haiti.  Singapore then beat Montenegro 4–1 to grab the bronze medal.

Group stage

Semi-finals

Bronze medal match

This match involved a lot of controversy, with a few Montenegro players accused of diving. Drawn 1–1, Singapore came back and eventually won the match 4–1.

Lion City Cup: Under-16s journey (2011)
Though captain Jeffrey Lightfoot was absent with an injury, the Under-16s became runners up of the competition under temporary captain Dhukhilan Jeevamani. They also went with new coach Takuma Koga.

Group stage
All attendances are referenced from ->

Semi finals
All attendances are referenced from ->

Singapore was first to shoot for penalties.

In the semi-final between the youth team and Juventus U15, man of the match Hazim Hassan scored two goals in the first half, and Juventus came back with another two in the second. The Singapore team beat Juventus in the penalty shootout.

Final

Fashah Rosedin (or Fashah Iskandar) was the most outstanding player that night against Flamengo. However, Caio Rangel and his other Samba football fellows brought the game to penalties where they won.

Lion City Cup: Under-15s journey (2011)
The Under-15 team, led by coach Dejan Gluscevic grabbed third, losing to eventual winners Flamengo U15 in the semi-finals by toppling Juventus U15 4–0 in the third place play-off.

Group stage

Their first group game, up against Newcastle United's U15 batch. Down 3–1, Singapore used just nine minutes to score 3 back and eventually win 4–3.

Semi-finals

The Singapore U15s navigated past the group stage, leaving Newcastle U15 behind, and reaching to a clash with competition favourites Flamengo. Eventually, they lost 3–0.

Third-place play-off

This match, along with the Singapore U16 semi-final with the same Italian opponents. The Italians were comprehensively beaten with the Under-15s clinching third place.

The AFF U-16 Championship (2011)
The U15 team, captained by Adam Swandi and coached by Dejan Gluscevic, took part at the AFF U-16 Championship, and finished in fourth place, winning 3 matches and losing 3 matches, including the semi-finals and the third place play-off. Adam Swandi scored five goals against Vietnam, the Philippines and Myanmar.

Competition records

FIFA U-17 World Cup

AFC U-16 Championship

AFF Youth Championship (U-16)

*Denotes draws including knockout matches decided on penalty kicks. **Red border color indicates tournament was held on home soil.

Recent results

2013

2013 AFF U-16 Youth Championship 

2014 AFC U-16 Championship qualification

2015

2015 AFF U-16 Youth Championship 

2016 AFC U-16 Championship qualification

2016
2016 Jockey Cup

2016 AFF U-16 Youth Championship

2017
2017 Jockey Cup

2017 AFF U-16 Youth Championship 

2018 AFC U-16 Championship qualification 

2017 U15 International Challenge Cup

2018
JENESYS 2017 Japan-ASEAN U-16 Youth Football Tournament 

2018 Jockey Cup

2018 AFF U-16 Youth Championship 

2018 U15 International Challenge Cup

2019
2019 Jockey Cup

 Friendlies

2019 AFF U-16 Youth Championship 

2020 AFC U-16 Championship qualification 

2019 U15 International Challenge Cup

2022
2022 AFF U-16 Youth Championship (31 July –13 August) 

2023 AFC U-17 Asian Cup qualification

Players and Staff

Current squad
These players are called up for the 2023 AFC U-17 Asian Cup qualification phase.

Recent call-ups
These players are called up for the 2018 AFF U-16 Youth Championship.

Coaches

Head coach
Singapore U16Angel Toledano (2022–present)

Former Head Coaches
Singapore U16Kadir Yahaya (2010)

Assistant coach
Singapore U16Abdullah Noor (2010–)
Singapore U15Shahrin Shari (2011–)

Player History

Captains
Note: Stand-in captain – Stood in when captain was absent (applies only for a standing in for at least 3 games in a row.)
The role of vice-captain does not apply here. Only caps and goals earned during captaincy are considered here.

Under-16s

Under-15s

Coach statistics
Note: Do note that all results are counted at the end of the final whistle, or a.e.t. if there is extra time. Matches with a penalty shoot-out outcome are still counted as a draw. Win PSO means the number of drawn games won via penalties, and the Win PSO (%) is the percentage of winning via penalties.

Under 16s

Under 15s

Stadium

The youth team uses the Jalan Besar Stadium, sharing it temporarily with the senior team before the senior team moves to Singapore Sports Hub when it has finished construction.

See also
Singapore national football team
Football Association of Singapore
Jalan Besar Stadium

Notes

References

u16
National under-16 association football teams
Asian national under-17 association football teams